Mongolküre County, also Zhaosu County as the Chinese romanized name, is a county situated within the Xinjiang Uyghur Autonomous Region and is under the administration of the Ili Kazakh Autonomous Prefecture, bordering Kazakhstan's Almaty Region to the west. According to the 2002 census, it has a population of 150,000.

Administrative divisions
Town (镇)
Mongolküre Town (昭苏镇)
Township (乡)
Xonuqay Township (洪纳海乡) | Uzunbulaq Township (乌尊布拉克乡) | Aqdala Township (阿克达拉乡) | Sarqobu Township (萨尔阔布乡) | Qashajar Township (喀夏加尔乡) | Qarasu Township (喀拉苏乡)
Ethnic Township (民族乡)
Chaganuysun Mongol Ethnic Township (察汗乌苏蒙古族乡) | Shota Kirghiz Ethnic Township (夏特柯尔克孜族乡) | Husongtukaerxun Mongol Ethnic Township (胡松图喀尔逊蒙古族乡)
Other (其他)
Zhongyang Ranch (种羊场) | 阿合牙孜牧场 | 种马场 | 天山西部林业局昭苏林场 | 军马场 | 煤矿 | 农四师（74团 | 75团 | 76团 | 77团

Climate

Education
The town has Shuguang Middle (Secondary) School, formerly Number 1 Middle School.

Agriculture
The primary crops cultivated are potatoes and wheat.

Economy
By 2020, the town had restaurants catering to Han Chinese tastes. The county is served by Zhaosu Tianma Airport.

Demographics
Additional Han people moved to the county circa 2008.

References

County-level divisions of Xinjiang
Ili Kazakh Autonomous Prefecture